Brad Gilbert (born August 9, 1961) is a former professional tennis player and an American tennis coach. During his career, he won 20 singles titles and achieved a career-high singles ranking of world No. 4 in 1990, and a career-high doubles ranking of world No. 18 four years prior. He won a bronze medal at the 1988 Olympics, and both a gold medal and a silver medal at the 1981 Maccabiah Games.

Since retiring from the tour, he has coached several top players, most notably Andre Agassi who won six of his eight Grand Slam titles under Gilbert's tutelage. Other players he has coached include Andy Roddick, Andy Murray, and Kei Nishikori.

Early life
Brad Gilbert was born on August 9, 1961 to a Jewish family in Oakland, California. Brad began playing tennis at age 4 after his father, Barry Gilbert (a history teacher and owner of a real estate firm), took up the sport. Despite being undersized, Brad became the top player at Piedmont High School following in the footsteps of his older siblings, Barry Jr. and Dana, who each held the top spot on the high school's tennis team.

Playing career

College 
Gilbert played tennis for Foothill College, a junior college in Los Altos Hills, California, from 1980–82, where he was coached by Tom Chivington. During this time, he won the California Junior College Singles Championship and the U.S. Amateur Hardcourt Championship. In 1981, Gilbert became a member of the American Junior Davis Cup team.

He competed for the US in the 1981 Maccabiah Games in Israel, losing in the men's singles finals to Israeli Shlomo Glickstein, but winning a gold medal in doubles with Jon Levine over fellow Americans Rick Meyer and Paul Bernstein.

In 1982, he transferred to Pepperdine University, playing for Allen Fox. He became an All-American and reached the finals of the 1982 NCAA Championship, losing to Mike Leach of Michigan 7–5, 6–3.

Professional 
Gilbert joined the professional tour in 1982 and won his first top-level singles title later that year in Taipei. His first doubles title came at the 1985 Tel Aviv Open, with Ilie Năstase; he also won the singles championship.

Gilbert won a total of 20 top-level singles titles during his career, the biggest being the Cincinnati Masters tournament in 1989. He was also runner-up in a further 20 singles events, including Cincinnati in 1990, where he lost to six-time Grand Slam champion Stefan Edberg, and the Paris Masters in 1987 and 1988.

Gilbert's most successful year on the tour was 1989, during which he won five singles titles, including Cincinnati, where he beat four future Hall of Famers to claim the title: Pete Sampras, Michael Chang, Boris Becker and Stefan Edberg.

Gilbert's best performances at Grand Slam tournaments were in the Quarterfinals of the 1987 US Open, losing to Jimmy Connors and in the quarterfinals of the 1990 Wimbledon Championships, losing to Boris Becker. He was also runner-up at the inaugural Grand Slam Cup in 1990.

Gilbert was ranked among the top-ten players in the U.S. for nine of his first ten years on the professional tour. His career win–loss record in singles play was 519–288.

Among his upsets of players ranked in the world's top 3 were his defeat of No. 2 Boris Becker, 3–6, 6–3, 6–4, in Cincinnati in 1989, No. 2 Edberg, 7–6, 6–7, 6–4, in Los Angeles in 1991, No. 3 Sampras, 6–3, 6–4, in London in 1992, and No. 3 Jim Courier, 6–4, 6–4, at Memphis in 1994, Edberg, 6–4, 2–6, 7–6, in Cincinnati in 1989, and perhaps most significantly, No. 2 John McEnroe, 5–7, 6–4, 6–1, at the Masters Grand Prix in 1985, which sent McEnroe into his first six-month break from tennis.

Style of play
Unlike many other professional players of his era, Gilbert did not have a major offensive weapon such as an overpowering serve or forehand. His best asset was his ability to keep the ball in play. He hit the ball most often at a slow but accurate pace and was sometimes called a pusher. In his 2002 autobiography, John McEnroe called Gilbert a pusher and claimed that Gilbert had the ability to bring talented players down to his type of game. In addition, McEnroe stated that Gilbert was the most negative person he had ever played tennis against, and he was riled by Gilbert's alleged non-stop tirades against himself while playing.

Gilbert kept an open stance and did not turn much during the swing at the baseline. This enabled him to control the game through oversight and tempo, despite his defensive style. He built his game around destroying his opponent's rhythm. He forced his opponent into long rallies by hitting the ball high over the net and deep into his opponent's court. If an opponent employed a slow pace, Gilbert attacked decisively, often at the net. He was one of the sport's top strategists as a player. Although he was easy to get along with outside the court, Gilbert was a fierce competitor with a sometimes annoying style of play, focusing on his opponent's weaknesses. Both his style of play and his mental approach brought him wins over the world's top players and kept him near the top 10 for six years.  The title of Gilbert's 1994 nonfiction book, Winning Ugly, was a self-deprecating nod to his unorthodox but successful tennis career.

Davis Cup
Gilbert compiled a 10–5 record in Davis Cup play from 1986–93, with a 7–1 record on hard courts and carpet.

Olympics
Gilbert won a bronze medal in men's singles at the 1988 Summer Olympics in Seoul.

ATP career finals

Singles: 40 (20 titles, 20 runner-ups)

Doubles: 6 (3 titles, 3 runner-ups)

Performance timelines

Singles

Doubles

Halls of Fame
Gilbert is a member of the USTA Northern California Hall of Fame, and the International Jewish Sports Hall of Fame.

Gilbert is also a 1999 inductee into the Pepperdine Athletics Hall of Fame.

Gilbert was inducted in 2001 into the ITA Intercollegiate Tennis Hall of Fame, and in 1996 into the Southern California Jewish Sports Hall of Fame.

Gilbert was a 2001 inductee into the Marblehead Boosters Hall of Fame.

Coaching career

Gilbert retired as a player in 1995. Since 1994, he has been successful as a tennis coach. This success has often been associated with the extraordinary tactical abilities exhibited during his own matches.

Andre Agassi

Gilbert was the coach of Andre Agassi for eight years, from March 1994 until January 2002. Agassi won six of his eight majors when Gilbert was his coach. Agassi described Gilbert as "the greatest coach of all time".

Andy Roddick

On June 3, 2003, Gilbert became the coach of Andy Roddick, who won the 2003 US Open under Gilbert's guidance, as well as clinching the year-end world no. 1 for 2003 and reaching the 2004 Wimbledon final. They parted ways on December 12, 2004.

Andy Murray

On July 26, 2006, Gilbert was announced as taking over the coaching duties of Scottish player Andy Murray. As well as coaching Murray, Gilbert took part, pursuant to a 3-year deal, in other British Lawn Tennis Association programmes, including tennis camps at under-12 and under-14 levels. He also worked with the LTA's network of coaches and its high-performance clubs and academies. On November 14, 2007, after 16 months working together, Gilbert and Murray parted company. By then, Murray had reached a then career-high ranking of no. 8.

Alex Bogdanović
In November 2007 it was announced that Gilbert would work for 20 weeks in 2008 for Britain's Lawn Tennis Association, concentrating mostly on coaching Britain's no. 2, Alex Bogdanović, and others in his age group. Bogdanović said he was "unbelievably excited" at the chance of spending time with Gilbert. Roger Draper, the LTA's chief executive, said:  "We have set Brad a new challenge of getting Alex into the top 100 and also 'upskilling' our coaches and inspiring the next generation to follow in Andy's footsteps."

Kei Nishikori

While still being committed to his TV items, in December 2010 it was announced that Gilbert would return to coaching, and partner with Kei Nishikori of Japan for 15 tournaments in the 2011 season. Gilbert's partnership with Nishikori concluded at the end of the 2011 season.

Sam Querrey

In February 2012, it was announced that Gilbert would work with American Sam Querrey on a trial basis in 2012.

Commentator and author
Gilbert now serves as a tennis analyst for ESPN. He is also the author of the book Winning Ugly, which gives tips on how an average player can defeat a more skilled opponent and better the average player's mental game. His second book, co-authored by James Kaplan and entitled I've Got Your Back, was published in 2005.

Personal life
Gilbert is Jewish and resides with his wife Kim in Malibu, California. He has three children Zach, Julian and Zoe.

He owns a tennis shop in downtown San Rafael, California called Brad Gilbert Tennis Nation. He was a close friend of tennis player and commentator Barry MacKay.

While covering Andy Murray's third-round match in the 2011 Australian Open for ESPN, Gilbert mentioned that he lives near the Olympian runner Michael Johnson and that when he was Murray's coach he introduced Johnson and Murray, who did a series of sprints together on a nearby track.

See also

List of select Jewish tennis players

References

References

Bibliography

External links

 Official website
 
 
 
 Brad Gilbert ESPn Bio
 

American male tennis players
American tennis coaches
Foothill College alumni
Jewish American sportspeople
Jewish tennis players
Maccabiah Games gold medalists for the United States
Maccabiah Games silver medalists for the United States
Competitors at the 1981 Maccabiah Games
Olympic bronze medalists for the United States in tennis
Sportspeople from Oakland, California
Pepperdine Waves men's tennis players
Tennis commentators
Tennis people from California
Maccabiah Games medalists in tennis
Tennis players at the 1988 Summer Olympics
1961 births
Living people
Sportspeople from San Rafael, California
Medalists at the 1988 Summer Olympics
21st-century American Jews